P-selectin is a type-1 transmembrane protein that in humans is encoded by the SELP gene.

P-selectin functions as a cell adhesion molecule (CAM) on the surfaces of activated endothelial cells, which line the inner surface of blood vessels, and activated platelets. In unactivated endothelial cells, it is stored in granules called Weibel-Palade bodies. In unactivated platelets P-selectin is stored in α-granules.

Other names for P-selectin include CD62P, Granule Membrane Protein 140 (GMP-140), and Platelet Activation-Dependent Granule to External Membrane Protein (PADGEM).  It was first identified in endothelial cells in 1989.

Gene and regulation 

P-selectin is located on chromosome 1q21-q24, spans > 50 kb and contains 17 exons in humans. P-selectin is constitutively expressed in megakaryocytes (the precursor of platelets) and endothelial cells.  P-selectin expression is induced by two distinct mechanisms. First, P-selectin is synthesized by megakaryocytes and endothelial cells, where it is sorted into the membranes of secretory granules.  When megakaryocytes and endothelial cells are activated by agonists such as thrombin, P-selectin is rapidly translocated to the plasma membrane from granules.  Secondly, increased levels of P-selectin mRNA and protein  are induced by inflammatory mediators such as tumor necrosis factor-a (TNF-a), LPS, and interleukin-4 (IL-4). Although TNF-a and LPS increase levels of both mRNA and protein in murine models, they do not appear to affect mRNA in human endothelial cells, while IL-4 increases P-selectin transcription in both species. The elevated synthesis of P-selectin may play an important role in the delivery of protein to the cell surface. In ischemic stroke patients, plasma P-selectin concentration was reported to be highly correlated to plasminogen activator inhibitor-1 activity and tissue plasminogen activator activity.

Structure 

P-selectin is found in endothelial cells and platelets where it is stored in Weibel-Palade bodies and α-granules, respectively. In response to inflammatory cytokines such as IL-4 and IL-13, P-selectin is translocated to the plasma membrane in endothelial cells. The extracellular region of P-selectin is composed of three different domains like other selectin types; a C-type lectin-like domain in the N-terminus, an EGF-like domain and a complement-binding protein-like domains (same as complement regulatory proteins: CRP) having short consensus repeats (~60 amino acids). The number of CRP repeats is the major feature differentiating the type of selectin in extracellular region. In human, P-selectin has nine repeats while E-selectin contains six and L-selectin has only two. P-selectin is anchored in transmembrane region that is followed by a short cytoplasmic tail region.

Ligand 

The primary ligand for P-selectin is P-selectin glycoprotein ligand-1 (PSGL-1) which is expressed on almost all leukocytes, although P-selectin also binds to heparan sulfate and fucoidans. PSGL-1 is situated on various hematopoietic cells such as neutrophils, eosinophils, lymphocytes, and monocytes, in which it mediates tethering and adhesion of these cells. However, PSGL-1 is not specific for P-selectin, as it can also function as a ligand for both E- and L-selectin.

Function 

P-selectin plays an essential role in the initial recruitment of leukocytes (white blood cells) to the site of injury during inflammation.  When endothelial cells are activated by molecules such as histamine or thrombin during inflammation, P-selectin moves from an internal cell location to the endothelial cell surface.

Thrombin is one trigger which can stimulate endothelial-cell release of P-selectin and recent studies suggest an additional Ca2+-independent pathway involved in the release of P-selectin.

Ligands for P-selectin on eosinophils and neutrophils are similar sialylated, protease-sensitive, endo-beta-galactosidase-resistant structures, clearly different from those reported for E-selectin, and suggest disparate roles for P-selectin and E-selectin during recruitment during inflammatory responses.

P-selectin is also very important in the recruitment and aggregation of platelets at areas of vascular injury. In a quiescent platelet, P-selectin is located on the inner wall of α-granules. Platelet activation (through agonists such as thrombin, Type II collagen and ADP) results in "membrane flipping" where the platelet releases α- and dense granules and the inner walls of the granules are exposed on the outside of the cell. The P-selectin then promotes platelet aggregation through platelet-fibrin and platelet-platelet binding.

P-selectin attaches to the actin cytoskeleton through anchor proteins that are still poorly characterized.

Role in cancer 

P-selectin has a functional role in tumour metastasis similar to E-selectin.  P-selectin is expressed on the surface of both stimulated endothelial cells and activated platelets, and helps cancer cells invade into the bloodstream for metastasis and provides local multiple growth factors, respectively. Moreover, platelets facilitate tumor metastasis by forming complexes with tumour cells and leukocytes in the vasculature, thus preventing recognition by macrophages. This is thought to contribute to the seeding of tumour microemboli in distant organs. In vivo mice experiments have shown that a reduction in circulating platelets could reduce cancer metastasis.

The oligosaccharide sialylated Lewis x (sLe(x)) is expressed on the surface of tumor cells and can be recognized by E-selectin and P-selectin, playing on a key role in metastasis of the tumor. However, in the 4T1 breast cancer cell line, E-selectin reactivity is sLe(x) dependent while P-selectin reactivity is sLe(x)-independent, suggesting P-selectin binding is Ca2+-independent and sulfation-dependent. One of the sulfated ligands is chondroitin sulfate, a type of glycosaminoglycan (GAG). Its activity in tumor metastasis has been probed by the addition of heparin that functions to blocks tumor metastasis. In addition to GAGs, mucin is of interest in P-selectin mediated tumor metastasis. Selective removal of mucin results in reduced interaction between P-selectin and platelets in vivo and in vitro.

Heparin has long been known to represent antiheparanase activity that is to keep an endoglycosidase from degrading heparan sulfate, one of the glycosaminoglycans, and to effectively inhibit P-selectin.  Despite a striking effect of heparin on tumor progression shown in a number of clinical trials,  the use of heparin as anti-cancer agent is limited because of its risk, which might induce adverse bleeding complications.  Given those reasons, development of new compounds that target P-selectin is now emerging for cancer therapy. Among them, the inhibitory activity of semisynthetic sulfated tri mannose C-C-linked dimers (STMCs) to P-selectin was shown by the attenuation of tumor metastasis in vivo animal model, indicating the inhibition of interaction between tumor cell and endothelial cell is significant for blocking tumor dissemination.

As a drug target
Crizanlizumab is a monoclonal antibody against P-selectin. which has now been approved by Novartis on November 15, 2019 for the indication of vaso-occlusive crisis in sickle cell patients.

See also 
 Selectin

References

Further reading

External links
 
 
 

Cell adhesion proteins
Selectins